Amazonas Futebol Clube, commonly referred to as Amazonas, is a Brazilian professional club based in Manaus, Amazonas founded on 23 May 2019. It competes in the Campeonato Brasileiro Série C, the third tier of Brazilian football, as well as in the Campeonato Amazonense, the top flight of the Amazonas state football league.

History
Founded on 23 May 2019 by a group of businessmen, Amazonas FC played their first professional tournament, the Campeonato Amazonense Second Division, nearly six months later. They won the tournament after defeating São Raimundo in the final.

In their first Campeonato Amazonense, Amazonas FC were knocked out in the first phase. In 2021, after Manaus FC reached the finals, the club qualified to the 2022 Série D for the first time in their history, after being the best-placed team in the first phase.

On 28 August 2022, Amazonas achieved a first-ever promotion to the Série C, after defeating Portuguesa-RJ in the 2022 Série D quarterfinals.

Honours
 Campeonato Amazonense Second Division
 Winners (1): 2019

References

External links
  
 Soccerway team

Football clubs in Amazonas (Brazilian state)
Association football clubs established in 2019
2019 establishments in Brazil
Amazonas Futebol Clube